A nightstand is a small bedside table.

Nightstand or Night stand may also refer to:

 Nightstand (album), by Tancred, 2018
 Night Stand with Dick Dietrick, a 1990s American television comedy show
 "Nightstand", a song by K. Michelle from More Issues Than Vogue, 2016

See also
 One-night stand